Joseph Bennet Komla Odunton (24 December 1920 – 22 December 2004) was a Ghanaian civil servant and communications expert. He served as director of information services in the Nkrumah government, an assistant press secretary to the queen and principal secretary to the ministry of information on two occasions; first in the first republic and also in the NLC government.

Early life and education
Odunton was born on 24 December 1920 at Kpong in the Eastern Region of Ghana (then Gold Coast).

He had his early education at the Aburi Methodist School from 1926 to 1934. He was admitted into the Accra Academy in 1935 for his secondary education where he obtained his Cambridge Certificate in 1939. In 1943, he entered the University College, Oxford, University of Oxford for his tertiary education on a government scholarship. He graduated in 1947.

Career
After secondary school, Odunton joined the civil service. He worked for the then Gold Coast Information department as its Assistant Propaganda Cinema Officer. His duties included trekking and campaigning on recruitment for the army. He served in this capacity until 1943 when he was awarded a government scholarship to study abroad.
A year after graduating at the University of Oxford, he returned to the Gold Coast and worked at the Ghana film unit as a script writer.  
 
In 1952 he was appointed the Ashanti Regional Information Officer. Two years later, he was promoted to Senior Information Officer. In 1957 he became the public relations officer of the High Commission of Ghana, London. He was later appointed Assistant Press Secretary to Her Majesty, Queen Elizabeth II in 1959. He thereby became the first black African to hold an appointment at the Buckingham Palace. He served as director of the Ghana Information Service from 1960 until 1 March 1964 when he was appointed Principal Secretary at the Ministry of Information and broadcasting, A year later he was moved to the State Publishing Corporation as its managing director.  
 
In April, 1966 he was re-appointed Principal Secretary at the Ministry of Information by the National Liberation Council government. In 1970, he was made Principal Secretary of the Ministry of Defense. In 1973, he was again appointed Director of Information Services and in 1974, he became Director of Scholarships at the Scholarship Secretariat.

Buckingham Palace Appointment
Odunton was appointed in 1959 by the Queen of the United Kingdom, Queen Elizabeth II after a palace party. He was there to represent the Ghana High Commission in London. He began work on Tuesday 19 May 1959 as the assistant press secretary at Buckingham Palace. He was responsible for organising the Queen and her husband; Prince Philip's visit to Ghana in November, 1959. He was also responsible for helping the Queen in her tour during the period. He worked as an assistant to Commander Richard Colville who was then the press secretary to the queen. In his statement he said: "I hope to be the first of many coloured people to be employed at the Palace".

Personal life
Joseph was married to Mercy Odunton, together they had four children. His son, Nii Allotey Odunton, is a mining engineer and was the Secretary General of the International Seabed Authority. His daughter the late Muriel Odunton was a British actress. His second daughter, Elizabeth Mary Baitie is the Principal of Merton Montessori School, which was established by Joseph and Mercy Odunton. 
He was a member of the Methodist Church of Ghana.
His hobbies included gardening and listening to music.

Death
Odunton died on 22 December 2004.

See also
 Royal Communications
 National Liberation Council

References

1920 births
2004 deaths
Alumni of the Accra Academy
Alumni of University College, Oxford
Alumni of the University of Oxford
Place of death unknown
Ghanaian Protestants